David Ford Jones (August 22, 1818 – February 20, 1887) was a Canadian manufacturer and political figure in Ontario. He represented Leeds South in the House of Commons of Canada as a Conservative member from 1874 to 1882.

He was born in Brockville, Ontario in 1818, the oldest son of Jonas Jones and Mary Elizabeth Ford, and studied at Upper Canada College. Jones set up business at Gananoque manufacturing farming tools. He served with the local militia during the 1837 Rebellions. He commanded an artillery unit at Gananoque which saw service during the Fenian raids. Jones also served as warden for Leeds and Grenville Counties. He was an unsuccessful candidate for the assembly for the Province of Canada in 1863, but was elected to the 8th Parliament of the Province of Canada representing South Leeds in an 1864 by-election held after Albert Norton Richards accepted the position of Solicitor General for Canada West. Jones did not run again in 1867, but was elected to the House of Commons in 1874 and 1878.

Jones married Rebecca Ogden Roebuck. He died in Gananoque at the age of 68.

References 

1818 births
1887 deaths
Conservative Party of Canada (1867–1942) MPs
Members of the Legislative Assembly of the Province of Canada from Canada West
Members of the House of Commons of Canada from Ontario
People of the Fenian raids
People from Brockville